Violette Malan is a Canadian editor and fantasy writer. She has a PhD in 18th-century English literature, and has worked as a teacher and a book reviewer.

Selected works
 Dead In The Water (editor with Therese Greenwood), 2006, Napoleon Publishing, 
The Mirror Prince series
 The Mirror Prince, 2006, DAW Books, 
 Shadowlands , 2012, DAW, 
Dhulyn and Parno series
 The Sleeping God, 2007, DAW, 
 The Soldier King, 2008, DAW, 
 The Storm Witch, 2009, DAW, 
 Path of the Sun, 2010, DAW,

References

External links
 Violette Malan's official Web site
 

Canadian fantasy writers
Canadian women novelists
Living people
Women science fiction and fantasy writers
Year of birth missing (living people)